Interim Alternative Educational Setting (IAES) is a term for an educational setting and program other than the student's current placement that enables the student to continue to receive educational services according to his or her Individualized Education Program.  The Individualized Education Program or IEP is a plan determined by a team who develops a set of modifications for the educational program of a special education student.  The setting is designed to allow the student to continue progress in the regular curriculum to meet the goals set out by the IEP and to allow students to receive services and modifications designed to help students address problem behavior.

Research Articles
Alternative Educational Settings, School District Implementation of IDEA 1997 Requirements by Cathy F. Telzrow

External links
 Idea terms to know

Education in the United States
Special education